La Nuit Bengali is a 1933 Romanian novel written by the author and philosopher Mircea Eliade.

It is a fictionalized account of the love story between Eliade, who was visiting India at the time, and the young Maitreyi Devi (protégée of the great Bengali poet Rabindranath Tagore, who became a famous writer herself). The novel was translated into Italian in 1945, German in 1948,  Spanish in 1952, Bengali in 1988, Esperanto in 2007 (as Fraŭlino Maitreyi as part of the Serio Oriento-Okcidento), Catalan in 2011 and Georgian in 2019. Its most famous translation is the one in French, published as La Nuit Bengali in 1950.

For many years, Maitreyi Devi was not aware that the story had been published. After reading it, she wrote her own version of the relationship in 1974. Entitled Na Hanyate, it was originally published in Bengali. It was published in English as It Does Not Die.

In fulfillment of a promise Eliade made to Maitreyi that his novel would not be published in English during their lifetimes, an English translation, of Mayitreyi, Bengal Nights did not appear until 1993. In 1994, the University of Chicago Press published the two works in English as companion volumes.

Plot 
Allan is an employee of the company run by engineer Narendra Sen. When sent to work in a rain-abundant region of India, Allan becomes ill with malaria. He is returned to Calcutta and admitted into a hospital. After treatment, Sen invites Allan into his own house. Shortly after the young guest falls in love with the host's daughter (Maitreyi), their forbidden love gradually grows, resulting in Maitreyi and Allan ending up together.
Chabu, Maitreyi's sister, unwillingly witnesses the lovers hugging thus banishing Allan and isolating Maitreyi. Both suffer immensely. To rid himself of the suffering, Allan retreats into a bungalow in the Himalaya mountains where he meets Jenia Issac.

Film, TV or theatrical adaptations
La Nuit Bengali is a 1988 film based upon the French translation of the same name. It stars Hugh Grant (Allan), Soumitra Chatterjee (Narendra Sen), Shabana Azmi (Indira Sen), Supriya Pathak (Gayatri), Anne Brochet (Guertie).

References

The Untold Story behind the Publishing of Maitreyi Devi
Passionate Fictions: Horizons of the Exotic and Colonial Self-Fashioning in Mircea Eliade's Bengal Nights and Maitreyi Devi's Na Hanyate

External links
Devi, Maitreyi It Does Not Die: A Romance
Eliade, Mircea Bengal Nights: A Novel

1933 novels
20th-century Romanian novels
Novels set in India
Romanian autobiographical novels
Romanian novels adapted into films
Romanian romance novels
Works by Mircea Eliade